This article describes the likely or potential target seats at the United Kingdom general election of 2015 that was held on 7 May 2015.

In January 2013, Labour published its list of 106 target seats for the next election. UKIP's list of 12 target seats was reported in August 2014, and others external to UKIP have highlighted seats where UKIP may be strongest. A list of Conservative non-target seats was deduced in February 2015. The Green Party of England & Wales describe having 12 target constituencies, including their one current seat.

Below are the most marginal seats listed by the party in second for those parties which won seats at the 2005 or 2010 general elections, ranked by the percentage swing required. These may not be the seats where parties choose to target their resources. Opinion polling in individual constituencies is also another indicator for possible target seats.

List by party

Conservative

Labour

Liberal Democrats

SNP

Plaid Cymru

Green Party

Respect Party

Northern Ireland

Notes

References

2015 United Kingdom general election
Lists of marginal seats in the United Kingdom by election